Juan Pablo Martínez Rodríguez (born 4 February 1999) is a Mexican professional footballer who plays as a full-back for Liga MX club Atlético San Luis.

Career statistics

Club

References

External links
 
 
 

Living people
1999 births
Association football defenders
Atlético San Luis footballers
Liga de Expansión MX players
Liga MX players
Tigres UANL footballers
Venados F.C. players
Footballers from Nuevo León
People from Guadalupe, Nuevo León
Mexican footballers